Limits of Stability (LoS) are defined as the points at which the center of gravity (CoG) approaches the limits of the base of support (BoS) and a correction strategy is required to return the center of mass (CoM) to within the BoS." In other words, LoS is the amount of maximum excursion an individual is able to intentionally cover in any direction without losing his/her balance or taking a step. The normal sway angle in the antero-posterior direction and medio-lateral direction is approximately 12.5° and 16° respectively. This area of stable swaying is often referred to as the 'Cone of Stability'. The limits of this cone of stability keep changing constantly depending on the task being performed.

Once the CoG moves outside the BoS, the individual must step or grasp an external device in-order to maintain his balance and refrain himself from falling.

These stability limits are perceived rather than the physiological, i.e.  it is the readiness of the subject to change their COG position.

Clinical significance
LoS is a reliable variable of stability that provides important information about voluntary motor control in the dynamic state. LoS helps assess balance in the dynamic state by instantaneously tracking the change in COM velocity and COM position. The LoS measures postural instability while screening for individuals who are at a higher risk of falling. Individuals with decreased LoS have an increased risk of falling when they shift their bodyweight forward, backward or from side to side and hence are more prone to injuries.

A restricted LoS significantly influences the ability to react to perturbations in balance control testing. This reduction in LoS may be because of weakness of the ankle and foot muscles, musculoskeletal problems of the lower limb, and/or an internal perception of the subject to resist larger displacements.
These impairments may help physicians to correlate with the medical examination findings and serve as an important outcome measure for rehabilitation of these specific underlying body impairments. 
From a clinical perspective, an individual who performs complex mobility tasks can function without support, and is better able to tolerate environmental challenges.

Possible causes of LoS impairment
 Impaired cognitive processing usually due to aging leading to attention deficits
 Neuromuscular impairments such as bradykinesia, ataxia, or poor motor control
 Musculoskeletal impairments such as weakness, limited ROM, pain
 Emotional Overlay like fear or anxiety
 Aphysiology (exaggeration or poor effort)

Limits of Stability Testing
Various tools such as the Functional Reach Test (FRT) and Limits Of Stability (LOS) test have been used to assess LoS.
 FRT: This is the conventional test used to assess balance and LoS in the forward direction. FRT is inexpensive and easy to use. The drawback of this test is that it assess balance issues in a standing posture where the feet are in a static position and measures LoS only in the forward direction.
LOS: This is a more sophisticated tool than FRT used to measure balance under multi-directional conditions. The subject is asked to stand on force plates and intentionally shift his body weight in the cued direction.

Parameters measured in LOS test
 Reaction Time (RT): the time taken by an individual to start shifting his center of gravity (COG) from the static position after the cue, measured in seconds
 Movement Velocity (MVL): the average speed at which the COG shifts
 EndPoint Excursions (EPE): the distance willingly covered by the subject in his very first attempt towards the target, expressed as a percentage
 Maximum Excursions (MXE): the amount of distance the subject actually covered or moved his COG
 Directional Control (DCL): a comparison between the amount of movement demonstrated in the desired direction, i.e. towards the target, to the amount of external movement in the opposite direction of the target, expressed as a percentage

Interpretation of LOS Results

The capability of moving around without falling is necessary for activities of daily living (ADL's) . Patients exhibiting delay in the reaction time, decreased movement velocity, restricted LoS boundary or cone of stability, or uncontrolled CoG movement are at a higher risk of falling. A delayed reaction time suggests that the individual might have problems in cognitive processing. Reduced movement velocities are indicate high-level of central nervous system deficits. Reduced Endpoint excursions, excessively larger maximum excursions and poor directional control are all indicative of motor control abnormalities.

A LOS scores close to 100 represents no sway and hence reduced risk of fall, while scores close to 0 imply a higher risk of falling.

Validity and reliability of LOS
The LOS test has been validated for use across multiple patient populations that include community dwelling elderly, neurological disorders, and back and knee injuries.
A study conducted by Wernick-Robinson and collaborators(1999) on the test retest reliability suggest that the amount of distance covered in the functional reach test alone cannot be an adequate measure of dynamic balance. It also suggests that for a better evaluation of postural control, additional assessment of movement strategies is indispensable.

Another study done by Brouwer et al. also claimed that LOS was a reliable measure for balance testing in healthy populations.

Functional Impact and Implications of LOS

The capability of moving around without falling is necessary for activities of daily living (ADL's).Instability during weight-shifting activities, or the inability to perform certain weight transfer tasks such as bending forward to take objects from a shelf, leaning backward to rinse hair in the shower, etc. can result from a restricted LoS boundary. The ability to voluntarily move the COG to positions within the Limits of Stability (LOS) with control is fundamental to independence and safety in mobility tasks such as reaching for objects, transitioning from seated to standing positions (or standing to seated) and walking. The LoS can be indicative of fall risks in the elderly, individuals with movement disorders and in neurologically impaired populations. The ability to voluntarily move the COG to positions within the Limits of Stability (LOS) with control is fundamental to independence and safety in mobility tasks such as reaching for objects, transitioning from seated to standing positions (or standing to seated) and walking.

References

Geriatrics
Biomechanics
Medical tests